Sporobolomyces is a fungal genus of uncertain familial placement in the order Sporidiobolales. Species in the genus are anamorphic yeasts. Teleomorphic forms are included in the genus Sporidiobolus. Generic synonyms of Sporobolomyces include Amphiernia Grüss (1927), and Prosporobolomyces E.K.Novák & Zsolt (1961), and Ballistosporomyces Nakase, G.Okada & Sugiy. (1989). Sporobolomyces species produce ballistoconidia that are bilaterally symmetrical, they have Coenzyme Q10 or Coenzyme Q10(H2) as their major ubiquinone, they lack xylose in whole-cell hydrolysates, and they cannot ferment sugars.

Species

S. alborubescens
S. bannaensis
S. beijingensis
S. bischofiae
S. clavatus
S. coprosmae
S. coprosmicola
S. corallinus
S. dimmenae
S. dracophylli
S. elongatus
S. gracilis
S. inositophilus
S. johnsonii
S. koalae
S. magnisporus
S. novozealandicus
S. odorus
S. patagonicus
S. productus
S. roseus
S. sasicola
S. salmonicolor
S. shibatanus
S. singularis
S. subbrunneus
S. symmetricus
S. syzygii
S. taupoensis
S. tsugae
S. xanthus
S. yunnanensis

References

External links

Basidiomycota genera
Basidiomycota enigmatic taxa
Sporidiobolales